The whitetail shiner (Cyprinella galactura) is a freshwater fish in the  family Cyprinidae. It inhabits the  Tennessee and Cumberland river drainages of Alabama, Mississippi, Georgia, North Carolina, Tennessee, Virginia, and Kentucky, Atlantic slope headwaters (upper Savannah and Santee river systems, North Carolina, South Carolina, and Georgia), the upper New River drainage in West Virginia and Virginia, and the Ozark Plateau and Ouachita Mountains portions of the White and St. Francis river systems in Missouri and Arkansas.

References

http://www.bio.utk.edu/hulseylab/Fishlist.html

External links
FishBase: "Cyprinella galactura Cope, 1868"

Cyprinella
Taxa named by Edward Drinker Cope
Fish described in 1868

Freshwater fish of North America